Donald Thomas Valentine (June 26, 1932 – October 25, 2019) was an American  venture capitalist who concentrated mainly on technology companies in the United States. He had been referred to as the "grandfather of Silicon Valley venture capital". The Computer History Museum credited him as playing "a key role in the formation of a number of industries such as semiconductors, personal computers, personal computer software, digital entertainment and networking."

Career
Valentine grew up in the Bronx, New York, was Catholic, and came from a family with Danish background.  He went to Mount Saint Michael Academy. After graduating with a B.A. from Fordham University, Valentine began his career as a sales engineer at Raytheon. He was in the position for less than a year before moving on to Fairchild Semiconductor, where he built up the sales force for seven years. He left and joined National Semiconductor, working as a senior sales and marketing executive.

In 1972, Valentine founded venture capital firm Sequoia Capital. Initially, the company focused on early venture investments with small, risky tech companies. Sequoia's first investment was in Atari in 1975 before the company was sold for $28 million to Warner Communications. Sequoia was one of the original investors of Apple Computer and Atari after Valentine met Steve Jobs when he was a line engineer for Atari, and in 1978, Sequoia invested $150,000 in Apple Inc. Sequoia Capital has also made early investments in companies including LSI Logic, Oracle Corporation, Cisco, Electronic Arts, Google, YouTube and many others.

Valentine was a chairman of NetApp and Traiana. He served on the boards of many other technology companies including Apple, Atari, C-Cube, Cisco Systems, Electronic Arts, Linear Technology, LSI Logic, Microchip Technology, NetApp, Oracle, PMC-Sierra. Valentine was featured in the documentary film Something Ventured which premiered in 2011.

Death
Valentine died on October 25, 2019, at age 87. He is survived by three children and seven grandchildren who all live in the Bay Area.

References

External links

 Sequoia Capital U.S.
 Sequoia website profile
 

American venture capitalists
2019 deaths
Fordham University alumni
American financial company founders
1932 births
American technology company founders
American chairpersons of corporations
American Roman Catholics
American people of Danish descent
20th-century American businesspeople